Christopher Vere Awdry (born 2 July 1940) is an English author. He is best known for his contributions to The Railway Series of books featuring Thomas the Tank Engine, which was started by his late father, Wilbert Awdry (1911–1997). He also produced children's books based on a number of other railways, as well as non-fiction articles and books on heritage railways. He was born at Devizes, the family moving to Kings Norton, Birmingham, when he was aged 5 months. Awdry was educated at Worksop College, a public school in North Nottinghamshire.

Christopher Awdry and the Railway Series
Christopher Awdry is in a way responsible for the creation of Thomas and his railway, which started as a story told to him by his father during a bout of measles in 1942. When his father retired in 1972, he wrote several Thomas books himself. The series came to be called Thomas & Friends after that.

In 2006, the current publishers, Egmont Books, decided to reprint the entire series in their original form; the fourteen books by Christopher were re-released at the beginning of August 2007. His favourite character is Toby.

The new interest from the publishers has gone beyond merely re-releasing the existing books. Christopher Awdry has written a new book for the series, titled Thomas and Victoria, which focuses on stories relating to the railway preservation movement. This, the forty-first book in the series, was released on 3 September 2007. In April 2010, Egmont Books confirmed that another Railway Series book, no 42 in the series, would be published in 2011. The publication date was later confirmed as 4 July 2011, and the illustrator as Clive Spong. It was published under the title Thomas and His Friends. This book would become the final book in the Railway Series to be published.

Other works
In 2001, Christopher Awdry wrote six stories featured in two books concerning railway safety, which were distributed to every primary school and library in the country (Bad Days for Thomas and His Friends / More Bad Days for Thomas and His Friends). The train operator Virgin Trains produced a colouring book for young passengers based on the stories.

A series of six books has been produced featuring locomotives from the Eastbourne Miniature Steam Railway, and illustrated by Marc Vyvyan-Jones.

Bibliography

Railway Series volumes

27. Really Useful Engines (1983)
28. James and the Diesel Engines (1984)
29. Great Little Engines (1985)
30. More About Thomas the Tank Engine (1986)
31. Gordon the High Speed Engine (1987)
32. Toby, Trucks and Trouble (1988)
33. Thomas and the Twins (1989)
34. Jock the New Engine (1990)
35. Thomas and the Great Railway Show (1991)
36. Thomas Comes Home (1992)
37. Henry and the Express (1993)
38. Wilbert the Forest Engine (1994)
39. Thomas and the Fat Controller's Engines (1995)
40. New Little Engine (1996)
41. Thomas and Victoria (2007)
42. Thomas and His Friends (2011)

Other 'Thomas' books
Thomas and the Missing Christmas Tree (1986)
Thomas and the Evil Diesel (1987)
Thomas and the Hurricane (1992)
Sodor: Reading Between the Lines (2005)

Thomas easy-to-read books
Published by Dean (Reed Children's Books), 1990–1997, illustrated by Ken Stott.
(Also published as Egmont 'mini books' (1997–1998))
Thomas and the Tiger
James and the Balloons
Percy and the Kite
Thomas and the Birthday Party
Henry and the Ghost Train
Thomas and the Dinosaurs
Thomas and the Pony Show *
Thomas goes to School *
Henry Goes to the Hospital *
Thomas the Tank Engine Easy-To-Read Treasury (1997) – incorporating the 3 titles marked * in a combined volume.

Eastbourne Series
01. General Takes Charge – illustrated by Marc Vyvyan-Jones
02. Rachel and the Goose – illustrated by Marc Vyvyan-Jones
03. Western and the Lost Ring – illustrated by Marc Vyvyan-Jones
04. Oily Keeps Things Going – illustrated by Marc Vyvyan-Jones
05. Eastbourne's Wedding Special – illustrated by Marc Vyvyan-Jones
06. Oily and the Flood – illustrated by Marc Vyvyan-Jones

Other railway stories
Railway for Sale
Luke Goes Flying – illustrated by Jonathan Clay
LOTI and the Enchanted Forest
LOTI and the Lost Locket
The Chips Express
Heave-Ho Hamish
Hugh Goes Sliding

Non-fiction

References

External links
 – Formerly www.awdry.family.name (Dead link discovered April 2010)
 – Formerly www.sodor.co.uk (Dead link discovered April 2010)
Official Thomas site
Egmont Books – Interview with Christopher Awdry

British children's writers
Awdry, C.
People from Devizes
1940 births
Living people